The Bay of Plenty by-election 1957 was a by-election held in the  electorate in the Bay of Plenty during the term of the 31st New Zealand Parliament on 6 April 1957.

Background
The by-election was caused by the resignation of incumbent MP Bill Sullivan of the National Party for personal reasons on 13 February 1957.

Candidates
Labour

Liberal Federation
Reginald Joseph Pedley stood for the Liberal Federation, a newly created party. The president of the Liberal Federation, James Hill-Motion, stated that the party planned to use the by-election campaign to advertise its policies to New Zealanders. He also pushed back on jibes that his party were "dissenting Social Crediters" instead saying "We are dissenting Nationalists, but we see a danger for the country in socialism."

National
There were seven names that went forward for the National Party nomination:
Lance Adams-Schneider, a businessman and member of the Taumarunui Borough Council
Donald C. Butler, a farmer and Chairman of the Whakatane County Council
A. T. Dillon, a farmer from Te Kuiti
Toby Gambrill, a lawyer from Gisborne
David Norman Perry, secretary of the Tekaha Co-operative Dairy Company and secretary of the New Life Movement in the Presbyterian Church
D. S. Radcliffe, a farmer from Edgecombe

Butler, the chairman of the South Auckland division of the National Party, was initially seen as the likeliest candidate to win the National nomination. On 11 March a selection meeting of about 140 branch delegates in Whakatane was held and chose Allen as the party candidate for the by-election.

Results
The following table gives the election results:

The by-election was won by Allen who remained MP for the electorate until he retired in 1975.

Notes

References

Bay of Plenty 1957
1957 elections in New Zealand
Politics of the Bay of Plenty Region